General Leobardo C. Ruiz International Airport or simply Zacatecas International Airport  is an international airport located in Morelos, Zacatecas, Mexico.

In 2020, the airport handled 232,352 passengers, and in 2021 it handled 375,930 passengers.

Airlines and destinations

Airlines previously flying to ZCL

Statistics

Passengers

References

External links
  Aeropuerto Internacional de Zacatecas at Grupo Aeroportuario Centro Norte

Airports in Mexico
Buildings and structures in Zacatecas
Transportation in Zacatecas
Zacatecas City